The year 1986 in science and technology involved many significant events, some not listed below.

Astronomy and space exploration
 January 24 – NASA Voyager 2 space probe makes first encounter with Uranus.
 January 28 – NASA Space Shuttle Challenger explodes on launch, killing all seven astronauts aboard. Their bodies are located by United States Navy divers on March 9.
 February 19 – The Soviet Union launches the Mir space station.
 March 8 – Japanese spacecraft Suisei flies by Halley's Comet, studying its UV hydrogen corona and solar wind.
 October 10 – Aten asteroid 3753 Cruithne, in co-orbital configuration with Earth, is identified by Duncan Waldron.

Biology
 May – First reported methods for constructing a monoclonal antibody containing parts from mouse and human antibodies, a required first step toward the development of humanized antibodies used later as medical therapeutics (such as Infliximab).
 English epidemiologist David Barker proposes his fetal origins hypothesis.

Computer science
 January 16 – The Internet Engineering Task Force, a standards organization that develops and promotes Internet standards, holds its first meeting, consisting of 21 United States government-funded researchers.
 January 19 – The first MS-DOS-based personal computer virus, Brain, starts to spread.
 April 3 – IBM unveils the PC Convertible, the first laptop computer.
 June 23 – Eric Thomas develops LISTSERV, the first email list management software.
 Internet Message Access Protocol (IMAP) is visualized by Mark Crispin.
 3D printing is developed by Charles Hull.
 Pixar is founded.

Mathematics
 Summer – Kenneth Alan Ribet demonstrates proof of the ε-conjecture, subsequently known as Ribet's theorem confirming Gerhard Frey's suggestion that the Taniyama–Shimura conjecture implies Fermat's Last Theorem.
 Lawrence Paulson makes the first release of Isabelle (proof assistant).
 Lee Sallows introduces the alphamagic square.

Technology
 January 11 – The Gateway Bridge is opened in Brisbane, Australia, the world's largest prestressed concrete single box bridge.
 April 26 – Chernobyl disaster: An RBMK at Chernobyl Nuclear Power Plant in the Ukrainian Soviet Socialist Republic reaches prompt criticality.
 December 23 – Rutan Voyager becomes the first aircraft to fly around the world without stopping or refueling, landing at Edwards Air Force Base in California after a nine-day trip piloted by Dick Rutan and Jeana Yeager.

Awards
Crafoord Prize in Geosciences: Gerald Wasserburg and Claude Jean Allègre
Fields Prize in Mathematics: Simon Donaldson, Gerd Faltings and Michael Freedman
 Nobel Prizes
 Physics – Ernst Ruska, Gerd Binnig, Heinrich Rohrer
 Chemistry – Dudley R. Herschbach, Yuan T. Lee, John C. Polanyi
 Medicine – Stanley Cohen, Rita Levi-Montalcini
 Turing Award – John Hopcroft, Robert Tarjan
 Wollaston Medal for Geology – Claude Jean Allègre

Births
 November 8 – Aaron Swartz (suicide 2013), American computer programmer and Internet hactivist.

Deaths

 January 7 – Rex Wailes (b. 1901), English engineer and historian of technology.
 January 28
 Crew of United States Space Shuttle Challenger mission STS-51-L:
 Greg Jarvis (b. 1944)
 Christa McAuliffe (b. 1948)
 Ronald McNair (b. 1950)
 Ellison Onizuka (b. 1946)
 Judith Resnik (b. 1949)
 Dick Scobee (b. 1939)
 Michael J. Smith (b. 1945)
 Dorothée Pullinger (b. 1894), French-born British production engineer.
 April 22 – Dame Honor Fell (b. 1900), English biologist.
 July 6 – William Rashkind (b. 1922), American cardiologist.
 July 21 – Zhang Yuzhe (b. 1902), Chinese astronomer.
 October 22 – Albert Szent-Györgyi (b. 1893), Hungarian physiologist, winner of the Nobel Prize in Physiology or Medicine.
 October 31 – Edward Adelbert Doisy (b. 1893), American biochemist, winner of the Nobel Prize in Physiology or Medicine.
 June 7 – Robert S. Mulliken (b. 1896), American physicist, winner of the Nobel Prize in Chemistry.
 November 25 – Sir Ivan Magill (b. 1888), British anesthesiologist.

References

 
20th century in science
1980s in science